The 2017–18 McNeese State Cowboys basketball team represented McNeese State University during the 2017–18 NCAA Division I men's basketball season. The Cowboys were led by 12th-year head coach Dave Simmons and played their home games at Burton Coliseum in Lake Charles, Louisiana as members of the Southland Conference. The Cowboys finished the season 11–17, 8–10 in Southland play to finish in a three-way tie for eighth place. They failed to qualify for the Southland tournament.

On March 5, 2018, the school announced that Dave Simmons would not return as head coach after 12 seasons at McNeese State. On March 15, the school hired BYU assistant Heath Schroyer as head coach.

Previous season 
The Cowboys finished the 2016–17 season 7–22, 4–14 in Southland play to finish in last place. They failed to qualify for the Southland tournament.

Roster

Schedule and results

|-
!colspan=9 style=|Non-conference regular season

|-
!colspan=9 style=|Southland regular season

|-

See also
2017–18 McNeese State Cowgirls basketball team

References

McNeese Cowboys basketball seasons
McNeese State
McNeese State
McNeese State